East Northamptonshire District Council in Northamptonshire, England was elected every four years. After the last boundary changes in 2007, 40 councillors were elected from 22 wards. The district was abolished in 2021, with the area becoming part of North Northamptonshire.

Political control
From the first election to the council in 1973 until its abolition in 2021, political control of the council was held by the following parties:

Leadership
The leaders of the council from 2009 until the council's abolition in 2021 were:

Council elections
1973 East Northamptonshire District Council election
1976 East Northamptonshire District Council election
1979 East Northamptonshire District Council election (New ward boundaries)
1983 East Northamptonshire District Council election
1987 East Northamptonshire District Council election
1991 East Northamptonshire District Council election
1995 East Northamptonshire District Council election
1999 East Northamptonshire District Council election (New ward boundaries)
2003 East Northamptonshire District Council election
2007 East Northamptonshire District Council election (New ward boundaries increased the number of seats by 4)
2011 East Northamptonshire District Council election
2015 East Northamptonshire District Council election (Some new ward boundaries)

Election results

District  result maps

By-election results

1995-1999

1999-2003

2003-2007

2007-2011

References

 By-election results

External links
East Northamptonshire District Council

 
East Northamptonshire District
Council elections in Northamptonshire
District council elections in England